New Zealand competed in the 1984 Winter Paralympics in Innsbruck, Austria. The country was represented by eight athletes (two women and six men), all in alpine skiing. It was the first time New Zealanders won medals at the Winter Paralympic Games. It was also the first time the country fielded female athletes in the Winter Paralympics.

Medallists

Alpine skiing 

New Zealand was represented by Ed Bickerstaff, Denis Butler, Martin Clark, Patricia Craig, Mark Edwards, Daryl Gill, Vivienne Martin (Guide Mike Curzon), Christopher Orr (Guide Roger McGarry) and Craig Philip, and obtained five medals. Coach David Boyd, Physiotherapist Kay Shears, Assistant Lorraine Preston(See above)

See also
New Zealand at the Paralympics
New Zealand at the 1984 Winter Olympics

Notes and references

External links
International Paralympic Committee official website

Nations at the 1984 Winter Paralympics
1984
Winter Paralympics